The Hairdresser's Husband, a 1990 French comedy-drama film written by Patrice Leconte and Claude Klotz, and directed by Leconte. Jean Rochefort stars as the title character.  Anna Galiena co-stars.

The film received the Prix Louis Delluc.  In 1991 it was nominated for "Best Foreign-Language Film" in the British Academy Film Awards.

Synopsis
The film begins with a flashback from the titular character, Antoine.  We are introduced to his fixation with female hairdressers which began at a young age.  The film uses flashbacks throughout and there are frequent parallels drawn with the past.  Though Antoine tells Mathilde that 'the past is dead', his life is evidence that on some level the past repeats itself.  As a young boy he fantasised about a hairdresser who died by suicide and as a man in his 50s he begins an affair with a hairdresser which ends after ten years in her suicide.  However, there are differences: Mathilde dies by suicide because she is so happy she is afraid of the happiness she has found with Antoine ending.

We are unsure what Antoine has done with his life; we know, however, that he has fulfilled his childhood ambition: to marry a hairdresser.  The reality proves to be every bit as wonderful as the fantasy and the two enjoy an enigmatic, enclosed and enchanting relationship.  The final sequence shows Antoine, in the salon, dancing to Eastern music just as he has done throughout his life.  His last line is the enigmatic comment that the hairdresser will return.

Cast
Jean Rochefort as Antoine
Anna Galiena as Mathilde
Roland Bertin as Antoine's father
Maurice Chevit as Ambroise Dupré dit Isidore Agopian
Jacques Mathou as Mr. Chardon
Philippe Clévenot as Morvoisieux
Anne-Marie Pisani as Madame Shaeffer
Albert Delpy as Donecker
Michèle Laroque as Adopted Child's Mother

Reception
The film received the 1990 Prix Louis Delluc which it shared with Le Petit Criminel by Jacques Doillon. American film critic Roger Ebert added this to his "Great Movies" list on January 27, 2010. The film was nominated for the Grand Prix of the Belgian Syndicate of Cinema Critics.

Home media
The Hairdresser's Husband was released on DVD by Umbrella Entertainment in April 2011. The DVD is compatible region code 4.

Soundtrack

The soundtrack  was composed by Michael Nyman and also contains a great deal of Middle Eastern popular music.  It was first released as an album in Japan by Soundtrack Listeners Communications (SLC) September 21, 1992 and has subsequently been released elsewhere.

References

External links

 
The Hairdresser's Husband at Rotten Tomatoes
Review of The Hairdresser's Husband

1990 films
1990s romantic comedy-drama films
French romantic comedy-drama films
1990s French-language films
Films directed by Patrice Leconte
Louis Delluc Prize winners
Films scored by Michael Nyman
1990 comedy-drama films
Hairdressing
1990s French films